, also referred to as , is a 2014 Japanese science fiction anime television series and the thirteenth installment in Sunrise's long-running Gundam franchise. 

Created for the Gundam 35th Anniversary celebration, it is the first Gundam TV series to be written and directed by Yoshiyuki Tomino since Turn A Gundam  in 1999 and features character designs by Kenichi Yoshida of Overman King Gainer & Eureka Seven fame.  Airing in the MBS/TBS networks' Animeism block from October 2014 to March 2015, it is the first traditional Gundam TV series to be initially released as a late night anime.  A 5-part film compilation series was released from 2019 to 2022.

Plot summary

In Regild Century 1014, 1,014 years after the end of the Universal Century, a young member of the Capital Guard named , charged with protecting the orbital elevator Capital Tower,  encounters and helps capture a highly advanced mobile suit, the G-Self and its pilot, while defending the tower from space pirates called the Pirate Corps. Feeling a connection with both the G-Self and its pilot, Bellri is able to control the mobile suit, operable only by a select few.

The G-Self is recaptured by the Amerian  spaceship Megafauna, and Bellri subsequently helps fend off attacks by the "Capital Army" - a militaristic faction from the Capital Tower advocating for rearmament, led by Colonel Cumpa Rusita - and its eccentric Captain Mask. The Megafauna returns to the Capital Territory to negotiate a ceasefire and alliance to prepare for an alleged threat from space, but the unexpected launch of an Amerian fleet causes hostilities to resume.

The Megafauna flees to space, arriving at the holy land of Sankt Porto atop the Capital Tower, which has been occupied by Amerian forces seeking control of utilities distributed by the Capital Territory. Recognizing the growing military strength of Earth's factions, the moon colony of Towasanga sends their Dorette Fleet to begin the "Reconguista", a recolonization of Earth. In the ensuing chaos, the Megafauna as well as a pair of Amerian and Capital Army ships journey to the moon.

At Towasanga, Bellri and Aida learn that they are the last surviving members of the royal Rayhunton family, sent to earth as children to protect them from the Dorette Fleet. Seeking the truth behind the conflict, Aida commands the Megafauna to the Venus Globe colonies, the source of the Photon Batteries and other advanced technology that has led to Earth's rapid militarization. After a battle with the G-IT Corps - another faction supporting the Reconguistra - they discover Cumpa Rusita is the Towasangan who brought them to Earth and provided Earthnoids with the blueprints for spaceships and mobile suits with the intention of spurring armed conflict and strengthening the human race.

The Megafauna returns to Earth with upgraded mobile suits and finds the war has escalated further. Ameria has allied with the Dorette Fleet while Captain Mask allies with the G-IT Corps to ensure his historically oppressed race has a place in the new world order. A chaotic final battle ensues at the Guiana Highlands among the remains of the past wars and Cumpa Rusita is killed in the crossfire between Bellri and Captain Mask. Having rediscovered the horrors of war throughout their adventures, the crew of the Megafauna force a ceasefire with technology from the Universal Century.

Some months later, a joint crew of Earthnoids and Spacenoids from multiple nations start a journey around the world to promote peace and understanding. Bellri disembarks in Japan and climbs Mount Fuji, intending to see the world on his own two feet.

Characters

Capital Army / Capital Guard / Capital Territory

Amerian Army / Pirate Corps

Towasanga

Venus Globe

G-IT Laboratory

Production

Background
The series began development prior to 2009, when Yoshiyuki Tomino approached character designer Kenichi Yoshida to perform preliminary design work.

The announcement was first publicized in September 2011 under the codename G-Reco. Previously, in November 2010, Tomino had previewed an unfinished novel in the 100th issue of Gundam Ace called , which revolved around a space elevator with similar characters and settings.  The scenario for the show was completed and the anime began full production in 2012.

Reconguista in G was officially unveiled at the Gundam 35th Anniversary event on March 20, 2014. During the unveiling, Tomino explained the "G" stands for "Gundam," but primarily means "ground." He also explained the word "reconguista" is based on the Spanish word reconquista; however, the Japanese audience prefers a voiced "g" in the title which necessitated the change.

Staff
Gundam Reconguista in G is Yoshiyuki Tomino's first major original animated work since The Wings of Rean in 2004, though he had directed a CGI short for Gundam's 30th anniversary in 2009 called Ring of Gundam.  The character designs of the series are by Kenichi Yoshida, who had his first character designs credit in Tomino's Overman King Gainer. The mechanical designs are by Akira Yasuda, who previously worked with Tomino as a character designer in Turn A Gundam and mecha designer in Overman King Gainer, Kimitoshi Yamane, who also worked with Tomino in Overman King Gainer, and Ippei Gyōbu, an advertising illustrator who was working on his first mechanical designs.  Yuugo Kanno is the composer of the music.

Short film
A short film with 3D CGI mecha scenes was released on May 21, 2015, featuring a battle between G-Self and G-Arcane, and the RX-0 Unicorn Gundam 03 Phenex from Mobile Suit Gundam Unicorn.  The film was released at Gundam Front Tokyo's Wall-G Theater in Odaiba, Tokyo, Japan.

Compilation films
The series received five compilation films. The first film, Go! Core Fighter, premiered on November 29, 2019. The second film, Bellri's Fierce Charge, premiered on February 21, 2020. Further films were delayed due to the 2020 coronavirus pandemic. The third film, The Legacy of Space, premiered on July 22, 2021.  The fourth film, Shouting Love Into a Fierce Fight, premiered on July 22, 2022, and the fifth film, Crossing the Line Between Life and Death, premiered on August 5, 2022.

Release
The first three episodes were compiled for preview screenings in limited Japanese theaters starting August 23, 2014.   This film was made available on the Japanese streaming website Docomo Anime Store in September 2014. The series aired in the Animeism block from October 2, 2014, to March 26, 2015, with a one-hour special of the first two episodes.

Sunrise released the series on home video (via Right Stuf Inc.) in 2016 while Anime Limited acquired the rights to release the series in Europe.

Music
The first opening theme is "BLAZING" by Garnidelia, and the ending theme is "G no Senkō" by Daisuke Hasegawa.

Related media

Manga adaptation
A manga adaptation of the show by Tamon Ōta is serialized in Gundam Ace magazine.

Video games
In Mobile Suit Gundam Extreme Vs. Force PlayStation Vita game, the G-Self is a playable unit. The Mack Knife was later included as DLC. Both of the units also appear on the Arcade Game Mobile Suit Gundam Extreme Vs. Maxi Boost ON and later supplanted by the G-Arcane with the full dress and G-Self again with the Perfect pack. In Mobile Suit Gundam Extreme Vs. 2, the Montero(Klim Nick's unit) is a playable unit and later supplanted by the G-Lucifer and the Kabakali. In Mobile Suit Gundam Extreme Vs. 2 XBoost, the G-Rach serves as a boss unit. Later, the Dahack serves as a playable unit.

Reception
The reaction to the series was mixed. Toshio Okada, a co-founder and former president of Gainax, has voiced concerns regarding the show's comprehensibility. He stated that "Ordinary people watch this and don't know what's happening," and "It's fine to make it for today's kids, but who does he think kids today are? Who does he think the kids that watch Yo-kai Watch are?" Lauren Orsini of Anime News Network criticized it in her review of the Gundam series as a whole. Stating "The storytelling is so confusing, it may take the entire series for you to figure out what's going on." She recommended against watching it entirely. Meanwhile, Japanese social critic and editor-in-chief of the PLANETS magazine, Uno Tsunehiro, gave it a highly positive critical response, stating that "[It is] in my humble opinion, this disorientation is somewhat intended... What we see here may be an intense message that goes against the times." He went on to state that it reflects the dilemmas that humanity faced in the 20th century, and how technology and digital age culture has made us lose our ability to perceive and understand these detached realities. Likewise, writer Gen Urobuchi wrote a highly positive critical response to it, stating "If there are infinite possibilities in writing, is it possible to write a story about the potential danger of stories? A story that renounces stories? Yes, it is. Reconguista of G did it", and "When I saw the end credits I was just moved, and exclaimed " they did it!". I had been worried about the limits of storytelling and was just thankful for this slap from a veteran creator to me. Reconguista of G made me genki."

In April 2015, Tomino responding to criticisms offered an apology to those who did not comprehend the story, stating, "If people tell me, 'I couldn't understand it because you aren't good at what you do,' then there's nothing for me to say but 'I'm sorry.'"

Commercially the series was a success. The limited-edition Blu-ray debuted 15th on the Oricon chart, with 3,864 units sold during the first week. The second volume of the Blu-ray debuted 4th on the Oricon chart, with 7,322 units sold in the first week. According to the Oricon chart, Gundam Reconguista in G ranked as the 22nd best selling anime of 2015 with 76,419 units sold in total.

References

External links

Official G-Reco website 

2014 anime television series debuts
2014 Japanese television series debuts
Animeism
Gundam anime and manga
Kadokawa Shoten manga
Mainichi Broadcasting System original programming
Sunrise (company)
TBS Television (Japan) original programming
Shōnen manga